The men's floorball tournament at the 2015 Southeast Asian Games was held at the ITE (Central), Singapore from 11 to 14 June 2015. The competition is held in a round-robin format, after which the top 2 teams at the end of the competition will head to play in the gold medal match while the other 2 teams play in the bronze medal match.

Squads

Results
All times are Singapore Standard Time (UTC+08:00)

Preliminaries

Final round

Bronze medal match

Gold medal match

See also
Women's tournament

References

External links

Men